The Château de Mavaleix is a château, constructed around the remains of an earlier 13th-century castle, in the commune of Chalais, Dordogne, France.

See also
 List of castles in France

Châteaux in Dordogne
Monuments historiques of Dordogne